Woodsdale is a rural locality and town in the local government areas of Southern Midlands and Glamorgan–Spring Bay in the Central and South-east regions of Tasmania. The 2016 census determined a population of 82 for the state suburb of Woodsdale.

History
Woodsdale was gazetted as a locality in 1972.

Geography
The Bluff River forms most of the eastern boundary.

Road infrastructure
The C318 route (Woodsdale Road / Buckland Road) enters from the north-west and runs through via the town to the south-east, where it exits. Route C311 (a continuation of Woodsdale Road) starts at an intersection with C318 and runs south until it exits.

References

Localities of Southern Midlands Council
Localities of Glamorgan–Spring Bay Council
Towns in Tasmania